Schmidt is an impact crater on Mars, located in the Mare Australe quadrangle. It measures approximately 201 kilometers in diameter. It was named after German astronomer J. F. Julius Schmidt and Russian geophysicist Otto Schmidt. The naming was officially approved by the International Astronomical Union (IAU) Working Group for Planetary System Nomenclature in 1973.

Images

See also 
 List of craters on Mars

References

Recommended reading 
 Lorenz, R.  2014.  The Dune Whisperers.  The Planetary Report: 34, 1, 8-14
 Lorenz, R., J. Zimbelman.  2014.  Dune Worlds:  How Windblown Sand Shapes Planetary Landscapes. Springer Praxis Books / Geophysical Sciences.

Mare Australe quadrangle
Impact craters on Mars